The Abandoned (Bosnian: Ostavljeni) is a 2010 Bosnian drama film directed by Adis Bakrač, produced by Almir Šahinović and Marie-Anne Coste. The film is a Croatian-French co-production. It stars Mira Furlan, Tony Grga, Mirsad Tuka, Mirela Lambić, Dragan Marinković, Meto Jovanovski, Zijah Sokolović, and was written by Zlatko Topčić. His script caught the attention of producers after winning the 2003 CineLink Screenwriting Competition.

The Abandoned is the story of a boy from a home for abandoned children, who tries to find out the truth about his origins, but enters into a criminal world.

The film premiered at the 45th Karlovy Vary International Film Festival on 8 July 2010. The film's US premiere was at the 2011 Santa Barbara International Film Festival. Tony Grga, who played a thirteen-year-old boy Alen, won the Golden Arena for Best Actor in a Leading Role at the 2010 Pula Film Festival.

Plot
The story begins in the woods in Bosnia in 1993, when a woman gives birth to a baby boy. Then, the story jumps to 2006. The boy, Alen (Tony Grga), now thirteen, lives in a children's home in Sarajevo.

The former director of the home, Gago (Meto Jovanovski), had told Alen that his mother was French and his father was English, and that they met as war reporters in Sarajevo, but due to the war and professional obligations they had temporarily left him in the home. Alen writes letters to his mother and gives them to educator Cica (Mira Furlan), to be sent to his mother in France. However, Cica places all the letters of children in a drawer, because in reality there is no one to send them to. A new director, Mirza (Mirsad Tuka), who is a young and capable educator, comes to the home.

Near the home is a shop owned by Šento (Dragan Marinković), a criminal. For him, the children steal expensive items. After a failed jewel robbery, police investigate, and Alen worries that they will link him to the robbery. When he gains access to the police files, Alen discovers the real address of his mother, and he leaves the home to find her.

Cast and characters

Tony Grga as Alen Domić, a boy from the children's home
Mira Furlan as Cica, an educator
Mirsad Tuka as Mirza Alijagić, director of the home
Mirela Lambić as Amila, Alen's mother
Dragan Marinković as Šento, shop owner, a criminal
Meto Jovanovski as Gago, former director of the home
Zijah Sokolović as Muamer, Amila's husband
Žan Marolt as a guard
Faketa Salihbegović-Avdagić as a cook
Ejla Tarakčija-Bavčić as Mrs. Tufekčić
Nermin Omić as Mr. Tufekčić
Alma Terzić as Zana, a girl from the home
Haris Burina as Mehmed, a salesman
Alen Goro as Muamer's son
Ivana Petrović as Muamer's daughter
Rijad Mašović-Riči as drug dealer
Alija Aljović as a policeman
Nela Dženisijević as a policewoman

Production

Screenwriter Zlatko Topčić described The Abandoned as a "look at the Bosnian war through the eyes of a boy who was born not as the fruit of love, but of hatred, and is part of a whole new people, nameless and unwanted, whose mothers were raped, and the search for identity, the search for his biological parents, who, each with his or her own reasons, do not want him - him, clean, sinless, innocent in everything, uninvolved in the sins of other".

Topčić wrote the screenplay in 2002 (working title of the film: Bare Skin). Later, he wrote the bestseller novel Bare Skin (2004) and the drama of the same name (2007), about the same theme.

Filming
Filming took place in Sarajevo and many other locations. Principal photography began in 2007.

Release

The Abandoned was released worldwide on 8 July 2010, by HEFT Production and Summer Hill Films (US). It was released to cinemas throughout Bosnia and Herzegovina on 7 December 2010.

Music

Musician Vlado Podany worked on the soundtrack for the film.

Accolades

Reception

Critical response
The film garnered positive reviews. The Hollywood Reporter called it the "unique artistic film". Alissa Simon of Variety praised the film emphasizing that it calls attention to "the plight of children born of rape during the war in Bosnia-Herzegovina", but described it as a "well-meaning but overdone melodrama". 

Fedeora penned a glowing review and wrote that "the film succeeds in being both a touching personal story but also a trenchant comment on the Bosnian war". On AllMovie, it has a perfect score of 5 out of 5 stars.

At the 2011 Santa Barbara International Film Festival, film critic Demi Mellett said: "The director does a great job at keeping the audience enthralled in what is going on throughout the whole film. The whole movie had a overtone of gray which showed how Alen was not happy because he couldn’t figure out where his mother was. The colors, gray shade of the film, and editing all brought it together, making the film work perfectly. All in all, I really enjoyed this film and would suggest it to anyone. The angles and music choice used in The Abandoned stood out to me. The story line was intriguing and the acting was done very well".

The film's world premiere was at the 45th Karlovy Vary International Film Festival, where it received a 15-minute standing ovation.

International festival circuit
The Abandoned was screened at over 80 international film festivals around the world, including the Pula Film Festival, Amiens International Film Festival, SEE a Paris Film Festival, Haifa International Film Festival, Festróia - Tróia International Film Festival, Alexandria International Film Festival, Hollywood Film Festival, Transilvania International Film Festival, Ljubljana International Film Festival, Karlovy Vary International Film Festival, Santa Barbara International Film Festival, St. Louis International Film Festival, and many other.

It was screened at festivals in the Czech Republic, Portugal, Romania, Slovenia, Sweden, Israel, Croatia, Egypt, France, Serbia and the United States.

See also
List of Bosnia and Herzegovina films

References

External links

2010 films
Bosnia and Herzegovina drama films
Films directed by Adis Bakrač
Bosnian-language films
2010 drama films
Films set in Sarajevo
Films with screenplays by Zlatko Topčić
Films about rape